Diefenthal is a German surname. Notable people with the surname include:

Frédéric Diefenthal (born 1968), French actor and director
Helmut Diefenthal (born 1924), German-born American radiologist
Josef Diefenthal (1915–2001), German war criminal

German-language surnames